DJ-Kicks: Deetron is a DJ mix album, mixed by Deetron. It was released in March 2018 under the Studio !K7 independent record label as part of their DJ-Kicks series.

Track list

References

External links
 Official Website

DJ-Kicks albums
2018 compilation albums